Streptanthus maculatus is a species of flowering plant in the mustard family known by the common name clasping jewelflower. It is found in Texas, Arkansas and Oklahoma. It is the type species for the genus.

References 

maculatus
Endemic flora of the United States
Flora without expected TNC conservation status